Neverita didyma, common name the bladder moon snail or moon shell,  is a species of predatory sea snail, a marine gastropod mollusc in the family Naticidae, the moon snails.

Subspecies
 Neverita didyma ampla (Philippi, 1849)
 Neverita didyma hayashii (Azuma, 1961)
 Neverita didyma hosoyai (Kira, 1959)

Description
The size of an adult shell of this species varies between 20 mm and 90 mm. Like all naticids, this species is a carnivore and a predator.

Distribution
This marine species is found in the Yellow Sea or off the coast of the Madagascar, Mozambique and South Africa of the Indian Ocean.

Culinary use 

In Korean cuisine the snails are used in a dish called golbaengi-muchim (moon snail salad).

References

 Dautzenberg, Ph. (1929). Mollusques testacés marins de Madagascar. Faune des Colonies Francaises, Tome III
 MacNae, W. & M. Kalk (eds) (1958). A natural history of Inhaca Island, Mozambique. Witwatersrand Univ. Press, Johannesburg. I-iv, 163 pp.
 Branch, G.M. et al. (2002). Two Oceans. 5th impression. David Philip, Cate Town & Johannesburg
 Kilburn, R.N. & Rippey, E. (1982) Sea Shells of Southern Africa. Macmillan South Africa, Johannesburg, xi + 249 pp. page(s): 71
 Steyn, D.G. & Lussi, M. (1998) Marine Shells of South Africa. An Illustrated Collector’s Guide to Beached Shells. Ekogilde Publishers, Hartebeespoort, South Africa, ii + 264 pp. page(s): 50
 Hollman M. (2008) Naticidae. In Poppe G.T. (ed.) Philippine marine mollusks, vol. 1: 482-501, pls 186-195. Hackenheim: Conchbooks.
 Torigoe K. & Inaba A. (2011) Revision on the classification of Recent Naticidae. Bulletin of the Nishinomiya Shell Museum 7: 133 + 15 pp., 4 pls

External links
 
 Seashells of NSW info

Naticidae
Articles containing video clips
Gastropods described in 1798
Edible molluscs